Zscaler is a cloud security company, with headquarters in San Jose, California. The company offers enterprise cloud security services.

History 
Zscaler was founded in 2007 by Jay Chaudhry and K. Kailash. In August 2012, Zscaler secured $38 million in funding from strategic investors. In March 2018, the company had an initial public offering in which it raised $192 million. The company is traded on the Nasdaq using the symbol ZS. Zscaler stock was added to the Nasdaq 100 on December 17, 2021.

As of July 2021, Zscaler has over 275 issued and pending patents.

Acquisitions

References

External links

Computer security companies specializing in botnets
Computer forensics
Content-control software
Companies based in San Jose, California
Software companies based in the San Francisco Bay Area
American companies established in 2007
Cloud computing providers
2007 establishments in California
Software companies established in 2007
Computer security companies
2018 initial public offerings
Companies listed on the Nasdaq
Software companies of the United States